Antonio Lacedelli is an Italian former ski jumper.

Career
He made his world cup debut on 30 December 1983 in Oberstdorf. He took 8th place in overall of 1985-86 Four Hills Tournament.

World Cup

Standings

References

Year of birth missing (living people)
Living people
Italian male ski jumpers